The 1921–22 season was the 47th season of competitive football in England.

Overview
The league underwent a major expansion for the second consecutive season, adding 20 teams from the Midlands and Northern England.  They were placed in the new Third Division North, and the existing southern-based Third Division became the Third Division South.  This was the first year the Third Division was split into North and South sections.

Honours

Notes = Number in parentheses is the times that club has won that honour. * indicates new record for competition

Football League

First Division

Second Division

Third Division North

Third Division South

Top goalscorers

First Division
Andy Wilson (Middlesbrough) – 31 goals

Second Division
Jimmy Broad (Stoke) – 25 goals

Third Division North
Jimmy Carmichael (Grimsby Town) – 37 goals

Third Division South
Frank Richardson (Plymouth Argyle) – 31 goals

References